Dimitar Apasiev is a Macedonian legal scholar, politician and the leader of the political party The Left. He is a docent of Law at the Goce Delčev University of Štip. During the 2020 Macedonian parliamentary election, his party The Left, won two seats, making him a member of the Assembly of North Macedonia.

Early life 
Apasiev was born on 22 September 1983 in Titov Veles, Yugoslavia, now a part of North Macedonia.

Education 
Apasiev completed his undergraduate degree in 2009, and his Master's degree in 2010. In 2015, he completed a PhD specializing in Roman law at the state university Ss. Cyril and Methodius in Skopje.

Career 
Apasiev is an author of a number of books and monographs, including over 50 academic articles and papers. He has been a legal consultant to several state judicial bodies, trade unions, civil society organizations and informal activist initiatives.

Political career 
In November 2015, Apasiev co-founded The Left, a political party which combined a number of leftist movements in North Macedonia.

Controversy 
The party found by Apasiev and he himself, have been described by some academics and news outlets as "fascist". In September 2020, Apasiev testified at the Public Prosecutor's Office in Skopje after receiving three criminal charges for spreading racial, religious, and ethnic intolerance. Apasiev was involved in a publicized argument in July 2022 with the president of North Macedonia, Stevo Pendarovski, involving personal insults.

References

External links 
CV

Living people
1983 births
Academic staff of the Goce Delčev University of Štip
Macedonian activists
People from Veles, North Macedonia
21st-century Macedonian politicians